Summer '87 was a various artists "current hits" collection album released in Australia in 1986 on the Polystar record label (Cat No. 830 674 1). The album spent two weeks at the top of the Australian album charts in 1987. It was available on vinyl, cassette and the new format (at the time) Compact Disc. It was the very first of these type of compilations that was available on CD in Australia.

Track listing

Side one
Lionel Richie – "Dancing on the Ceiling"
The Communards – "Don't Leave Me This Way"
Elton John – "Heartache All Over the World"
Eurythmics – "Missionary Man"
Hollywood Beyond – "What's the Colour of Money"
Oingo Boingo – "Stay" [Not on LP]
Wa Wa Nee – "I Could Make You Love Me"
Stacey Q – "Two of Hearts"
Cyndi Lauper – "True Colors"

Side two
Run–D.M.C. featuring Aerosmith – "Walk This Way"
Kenny Loggins – "Danger Zone"
Dragon – "Dreams of Ordinary Men"
Bon Jovi – "You Give Love a Bad Name"
Jenny Morris – "You're Gonna Get Hurt" [Not on LP]
Belinda Carlisle – "Mad About You"
Billy Joel – "A Matter of Trust"
Berlin – "Take My Breath Away"
John Farnham – "You're the Voice"

Charts

References

1986 compilation albums
Pop compilation albums
Rock compilation albums